Heritage High School is a public high school in Frisco, Texas (USA). It is part of the Frisco Independent School District.

History 
Heritage opened for the first time to freshmen and sophomore students in the fall of 2009. In 2015, the school was rated "Met Standard" by the Texas Education Agency. Heritage High School is ranked 105th within Texas. The school offers Advanced Placement (AP) coursework and exams; the AP participation rate at Heritage High School is 57%. The total minority enrollment is 59%, and 14% of students are economically disadvantaged. Heritage High School is 1 of 12 high schools in the Frisco ISD.

Heritage High School has an 8/10 GREATSCHOOLS rating. This school is rated above average in school quality compared to other schools in Texas.

Athletics

The Heritage Coyotes compete in the following sports:

 Baseball
 Basketball
 Cross Country
 Football
 Golf
 Powerlifting
 Soccer
 Softball
 Swimming and Diving
 Tennis
 Track and Field
 Volleyball
 Wrestling

District champions
Football (2014-2015) 
Boys Soccer (2012 & 2013)
Girls Track (2012 - 2014) 
Boys Track (2016)
Team Tennis (2020)

Heritage Theatre

In fall 2009, Heritage Theatre opened with a production of The Secret Garden. Theatre Fest followed where classes put on shows such as Pygmalion, Alice in Wonderland, and The Miracle Worker. The University Interscholastic League One Act Play was The Butterfly's Evil Spell by Federico Garcia Lorca. The 2010–2011 year had a summer performance of Twelfth Night by William Shakespeare. It also put on La Dispute and Pride and Prejudice.

Heritage High School Band

Accomplishments

During the school's first two years (2009 and 2010), the band achieved two 1st division ratings at University Interscholastic League contests for marching and concert. Its first show in 2009 was "State of Mind." Its second show in 2010 was "Speed". Its 2011 show "Windsprints" earned the marching band another 1st division rating at University Interscholastic League.

Heritage High School Orchestra

The orchestra program began in 2009 and is directed by Elizabeth Balkema. In 2011, the Heritage Orchestra received superior ratings from all six judges at the Region 24 UniversityIL competition.

References

External links
 

2009 establishments in Texas
Educational institutions established in 2009
High schools in Collin County, Texas
Frisco Independent School District high schools